The 1971–72 Michigan Wolverines men's basketball team represented the University of Michigan in intercollegiate college basketball during the 1971–72 NCAA University Division men's basketball season. The team played its home games at Crisler Arena on the school's campus in Ann Arbor, Michigan.

Under the direction of head coach Johnny Orr, the team finished with a 14–10 overall record and a 9–5 conference record. This tied the team for third in the Big Ten Conference but failed to get an invitation to either the 1972 NCAA Men's Division I Basketball Tournament or the 1972 National Invitation Tournament.

Wayne Grabiac and Dave Hart served as team captains, while Henry Wilmore earned team MVP. The team earned the Big Ten scoring offense statistical championship with an 81.8 average in conference games. It also led the conference in field goal percentage with a 45.3% in conference games. Additionally, the team led the conference in rebounding with a 51.6 average in conference games.

The team was in the Associated Press Top Twenty Poll for four of the sixteen weeks of the season, rising as high as number nine after starting the season ranked at number thirteen.  However, the team ended the season unranked in both the final UPI Coaches' Poll and the final AP Poll.

During the season, the team beat two of the four ranked opponents that it faced (#16 Illinois by a 75–70 margin on January 11, 1972, at Assembly Hall in Champaign and #6  on January 29, 1972, at Crisler Arena by an 88–78 margin).  The team was led by Consensus second team All-American Wilmore.

Rankings

Team players drafted into the NBA
Four players from this team were selected in the NBA Draft.

References

Michigan
Michigan Wolverines men's basketball seasons
Michigan Basketball
Michigan Basketball